Beasley is a surname. Notable people with the surname include:

 Aaron Beasley, a United States-born National Football League cornerback
 Allyce Beasley, a United States-born actress
 Barney Beasley (1895–1951), American character actor
 Bruce Beasley (American sculptor), a United States sculptor
 Cecil A. Beasley (1876–1959), American lawyer and politician from Alabama.
 Cheri Beasley, a United States-born judge
 Chris Beasley, Australian political scientist
 Christine Beasley, a British-born dame and the Chief Nursing Officer of England
 Cole Beasley (born 1989), a United States-born football player
 DaMarcus Beasley, a United States-born soccer player; brother of Jamar
 David Beasley, a United States-born politician who served as the Governor of South Carolina
 Debra Lafave, formerly Debra Beasley, a United States-born former teacher and registered sex offender
 Eileen Beasley, Welsh language campaigner
 Fred Beasley, a United States-born National Football League cornerback
 Henry Beasley, Indian-born British officer and bridge player
 Jack Beasley, an Australian-born politician
 Jamar Beasley, a United States-born soccer player; brother of DaMarcus
 Jere Beasley, a United States-born politician and Lieutenant Governor of Alabama
 Jeremy Beasley, an American baseball player
 Jerome Beasley, a United States-born basketball player
 John Beasley (actor), a United States-born actor
 John Beasley (basketball), a United States-born basketball player
 John Beasley (football player), a United States-born football player and color commentator
 John Beasley (musician), a United States-born composer, pianist, producer, and arranger
 Larry Beasley, a Canadian-born urban planner 
 Malcolm Beasley, an American physicist in the field of superconductivity
 Marco Beasley, a Neapolitan-British tenor and musicologist
 Maria Beasley, an American inventor and businesswoman 
 Michael Beasley, a United States-born basketball player
 Nate Beasley, American football player
 Pat Beasley, an English professional footballer and coach
 Pierce Beasley,  or Piaras Béaslaí, a Liverpool-born Irish Republican politician
 Richard Beasley (author), an Australian author
 Richard Beasley (politician), a United States-born, Canadian-residing businessman, politician, and soldier
 Richard Beasley, convicted of luring three men to their deaths via a Craigslist ad in 2011
 Richard Lee Beasley, an American politician from South Carolina
 Sharon Beasley-Teague (born 1952), American politician
 Sheree Beasley, An Australian murder victim
 Simon Beasley, an Australian rules footballer
 Thomas W. Beasley, American lawyer, political activist, businessman; co-founder of Corrections Corporation of America
 Tom Beasley (born 1954), American football player
 Tony Beasley (born 1966), American baseball coach

See also
Beazley
Besley, a surname

English toponymic surnames